Abdelhak Ben Salah (born 25 April 1990) is a Tunisian handball player for Esperance Sportive de Tunis and the Tunisian national team.

References

1990 births
Living people
Tunisian male handball players
Place of birth missing (living people)
Mediterranean Games competitors for Tunisia
Competitors at the 2013 Mediterranean Games